Shangshu Township is a township under the administration of Anji County, Zhejiang, China. , it has seven villages under its administration:
Shangshu Village
Dongling Village
Liujiatang Village
Luo Village
Tiangai Village
Longwang Village
Shiruan Village

References 

Township-level divisions of Zhejiang
Anji County